Caravate is a comune (municipality) in the Province of Varese in the Italian region Lombardy, located about  northwest of Milan and about  northwest of Varese.

The municipality of Caravate contains the frazioni (subdivisions, mainly villages and hamlets) Stallazzo, San Clemente, Fornazze, Canton d'Oro, Canton Chiedo, Cadè, Castello, Cà Stecco, Pozzei, Monte San Giano, Santa Maria del Sasso, Virolo, and Fornace Farsani.

Caravate borders the following municipalities: Besozzo, Cittiglio, Gemonio, Laveno-Mombello, Leggiuno, Sangiano.

Demographic evolution

References

Cities and towns in Lombardy